Sonnborner Straße station is an intermediate station on the Wuppertal Suspension Railway in Westphalia, Germany. It was opened on 24 May 1901 and is within walking distance of Wuppertal-Sonnborn station.

References

Wuppertal Schwebebahn
Monorail stations
Railway stations in Wuppertal